Freeflight is a live album by American jazz pianist Ahmad Jamal featuring performances recorded at the Montreux Jazz Festival in 1971 for the Impulse! label.  Additional performances from this concert were released as Outertimeinnerspace in 1972. It was also the first album to have Jamal play electric piano. The Rhodes Piano was given to him by somebody living in Switzerland, and Jamal said he would continue to play the instrument in the future as well as his standard acoustic piano.

Critical reception
The Allmusic review by Scott Yanow awarded the album 4½ stars calling it "one of pianist Ahmad Jamal's finest recordings of the early '70s... An excellent effort".

Track listing
All compositions by Ahmad Jamal except as indicated
 Introduction – 0:53 
 "Effendi" (McCoy Tyner) – 11:27 
 "Dolphin Dance" (Herbie Hancock) – 4:51 
 "Manhattan Reflections" – 10:00 
 "Poinciana" (Buddy Bernier, Nat Simon) – 11:28 
Recorded at the Montreux Jazz Festival in the Casino De Montreux in Switzerland on June 17, 1971

Personnel
Ahmad Jamal – piano, electric piano
Jamil Nasser – bass
Frank Gant – drums

References 

Impulse! Records live albums
Ahmad Jamal live albums
1971 live albums
Albums recorded at the Montreux Jazz Festival